The British Association for Japanese Studies, BAJS, is an association at Essex University in the United Kingdom, whose aim is to promote studies in Japan. Founded in 1974, the organisation is a member of the Japan Library Group and hands out the annual Morris Memorial Award.

It is principally sponsored by Toshiba and the Japan Foundation.

Japan Forum is the official journal of the BJS.

References

External links
 

Japanese language
Educational organisations based in the United Kingdom
Japanese studies
Organizations established in 1974
1974 establishments in the United Kingdom